Lo Wai is a walled village in Lung Yeuk Tau, Fanling, Hong Kong. It is one of the Five Wai (walled villages) and Six Tsuen (villages) in Lung Yeuk Tau.

Administration
Lo Wai is one of the villages represented within the Fanling District Rural Committee. For electoral purposes, Lo Wai is part of the Queen's Hill constituency, which is currently represented by Law Ting-tak.

Lo Wai, as part of Lung Yeuk Tau, is a recognized village under the New Territories Small House Policy.

Conservation
Lo Wai is located along the Lung Yeuk Tau Heritage Trail. The entrance tower and walls surrounding Lo Wai are declared monuments.

See also
 Walled villages of Hong Kong
 Tang Chung Ling Ancestral Hall, located between Lo Wai and Tsz Tong Tsuen

References

External links

 Delineation of area of existing village Lung Yeuk Tau (Fanling) for election of resident representative (2019 to 2022) (includes Lo Wai)
 Antiquities and Monuments Office. Hong Kong Traditional Chinese Architectural Information System. Lo Wai
 Virtual tour of Entrance Tower & Enclosing Walls of Lo Wai

Walled villages of Hong Kong
Declared monuments of Hong Kong
Lung Yeuk Tau
Villages in North District, Hong Kong